Fahmi al-Abboushi (1895–1975) was the co-founder of the Arab nationalist political party Hizb al-Istiqlal (Independence Party) in Palestine along with his close associate Awni Abd al-Hadi. 

Abboushi was Mayor of Jenin from 1935 until he was dismissed from the post by the British in 1937, after which he lived in exile in Beirut, Lebanon.

Abboushi was the chairman of the Arab Bank, Jenin branch, in the 1940s. He also served on numerous national committees during and after the British Mandate of Palestine. He was known for his oratory skills.

External links
 Al-Abboushi, Fahmi Sharif  (1895-1975), Palestinian Academic Society for the Study of International Affairs

1895 births
1975 deaths
Independence Party (Mandatory Palestine) politicians
Mayors of Jenin
Palestinian Arab nationalists
Politicians from Beirut